This is a new event to the 2011 ITF Women's Circuit. 
Victoria Larrière won the title by defeating Sarah Gronert in the final 6–3, 1–6, 7–5.

Seeds

Main draw

Finals

Top half

Bottom half

References
 Main Draw
 Qualifying Draw

ITK Open - Singles